In computer science (particularly algorithmics), a polynomial-time approximation scheme (PTAS) is a type of approximation algorithm for optimization problems (most often, NP-hard optimization problems).

For example, for the Euclidean traveling salesman problem, a PTAS would produce a tour with length at most , with  being the length of the shortest tour. 

The running time of a PTAS is required to be polynomial in the problem size for every fixed ε, but can be different for different ε. Thus an algorithm running in time  or even  counts as a PTAS.

Variants

Deterministic
This ensures that an increase in problem size has the same relative effect on runtime regardless of what ε is being used; however, the constant under the big-O can still depend on ε arbitrarily. In other words, an EPTAS runs in FPT time where the parameter is ε. 

Unless P = NP, it holds that . Consequently, under this assumption, APX-hard problems do not have PTASs.

Another deterministic variant of the PTAS is the quasi-polynomial-time approximation scheme or QPTAS. A QPTAS has time complexity  for each fixed . Furthermore, a PTAS can run in FPT time for some parameterization of the problem, which leads to a parameterized approximation scheme.

Randomized
Some problems which do not have a PTAS may admit a randomized algorithm with similar properties, a polynomial-time randomized approximation scheme or PRAS. A PRAS is an algorithm which takes an instance of an optimization or counting problem and a parameter  and, in polynomial time, produces a solution that has a high probability of being within a factor  of optimal. Conventionally, "high probability" means probability greater than 3/4, though as with most probabilistic complexity classes the definition is robust to variations in this exact value (the bare minimum requirement is generally greater than 1/2).

As a complexity class
The term PTAS may also be used to refer to the class of optimization problems that have a PTAS.  PTAS is a subset of APX, and unless P = NP, it is a strict subset. 

Membership in PTAS can be shown using a PTAS reduction, L-reduction, or P-reduction, all of which preserve PTAS membership, and these may also be used to demonstrate PTAS-completeness.  On the other hand, showing non-membership in PTAS (namely, the nonexistence of a PTAS), may be done by showing that the problem is APX-hard, after which the existence of a PTAS would show P = NP.  APX-hardness is commonly shown via PTAS reduction or AP-reduction.

See also 

 Parameterized approximation scheme, an approximation scheme that runs in FPT time

References

External links
Complexity Zoo: PTAS, EPTAS.
Pierluigi Crescenzi, Viggo Kann, Magnús Halldórsson, Marek Karpinski, and Gerhard Woeginger, A compendium of NP optimization problems – list which NP optimization problems have PTAS.

Approximation algorithms
Complexity classes